Arnold Josiah Ford (23 April 1877 – 16 September 1935) was a Barbadian American spiritual leader, recognized as a pioneering figure of the Black Hebrew movement.

Biography
Ford was born in Barbados to Edward Thomas Ford and Elizabeth Augustine Ford.  He grew up to become a musician in the Royal Navy before settling in the United States. Talented as a linguist, poet, musician and composer of many Universal Negro Improvement Association and African Communities League (UNIA-ACL) songs, Ford co-authored The Universal Ethiopian Anthem with Benjamin E. Burrell. Ford officially functioned as director of UNIA Band, Orchestra, Band of the African Legion, and the Liberty Hall Choir. He published the Universal Ethiopian Hymnal in 1920.

Following Garvey’s arrest and conviction, Ford founded the Beth B’Nai Israel Synagogue in a Harlem storefront, and declared himself to be a rabbi. He was never recognized as such by the wider Jewish community. In 1930 he and a small group of Black Jews went to Ethiopia, where they participated in the coronation of Emperor Haile Selassie. They created a school, and acquired  of land for the purpose of uniting Black Jews of the Diaspora with their brothers already in Ethiopia. He died there in 1935.

Shais Rishon, a Black Orthodox Jewish writer and activist, has claimed that "Ford never belonged nor converted to any branch of Judaism."

References

External links
 The Official UNIA-ACL website
Levy, Sholomo B. September 11th: A Tragedy in Search of Meaning

1877 births
1935 deaths
Royal Navy sailors
Universal Negro Improvement Association and African Communities League members
African-American religious leaders
Rabbis from New York (state)
American people of Barbadian descent
Black Hebrew Israelite religious leaders